Matías Martín Rubio Köstner (born 8 August 1988) is a Chilean footballer who plays as striker for Deportes Recoleta.

Career

Club
In August 2016, Rubio joined Kazakhstan Premier League side FC Akzhayik.

Personal life
He is a member of a football family nicknamed "Rubio Dynasty" since his grandfather Ildefonso, his father Hugo, and his two brothers, Eduardo and Diego, were or are professional footballers.

Honours

Club
Universidad Católica
 Primera División de Chile (1): 2010

References

External links
 

1988 births
Living people
People from Santiago
People from Santiago Province, Chile
People from Santiago Metropolitan Region
Footballers from Santiago
Chilean people of German descent
Chilean footballers
Chilean expatriate footballers
Chilean Primera División players
Primera B de Chile players
Kazakhstan Premier League players
Segunda División Profesional de Chile players
Club Deportivo Universidad Católica footballers
Rangers de Talca footballers
Deportes Concepción (Chile) footballers
Unión La Calera footballers
Deportes Temuco footballers
FC Akzhayik players
Deportes Colchagua footballers
Deportes Recoleta footballers
Chilean expatriate sportspeople in Kazakhstan
Expatriate footballers in Kazakhstan
Association football forwards